The Sfax Archaeological Museum is an archaeological museum located in Sfax, Tunisia.

History
The Sfax Archaeological Museum was established in 1907, making it the third oldest museum in the country. During World War II, the museum was hit by bombings. The first exhibition room opened in 1955. Three new rooms opened in 1966.

Description
The museum is located in the city's town hall.

Most of the museum's collection comes from the Roman period (mosaics, glass, pottery, coins). Artefacts on display are from the sites of Thenae, Taparura, Louza and Mahres. It also holds the country largest collection of blown glass.

Collection
Double-tomb mosaic for C. Julius Serenus and Numitoria Saturnina from Thenae
Mosaic pavement from a baptistery near Skhira
Mosaic pavement of Matrona, 5th century near Skhira
Mosaic pavement with geometric and floral decoration from the house of Dionysus, 3rd century near Thenae

See also

African archaeology
Culture of Tunisia
List of museums in Tunisia

References

External links
 List of mosiacs from the museum

Museums established in 1907
1907 establishments in Tunisia
Archaeological museums in Tunisia
Tourist attractions in Tunisia
Sfax